Colceresa is a comune in the province of Vicenza, Veneto region of Italy. It was formed on 20 February 2019 with the merger of the comunes of Mason Vicentino and Molvena.

Sport
ASD Colceresa is the towns' football team based in Colceresa, that hosts his home matches in both Mason and Molvena and currently plays in the Italian Prima Categoria, the 7th tier of the Italian football league system.

Sources

Cities and towns in Veneto